Kohinata is a Japanese surname. Notable people with the surname include:

, Japanese actor
, Japanese bandit
, Japanese swimmer
, Japanese actress, television personality and singer

Fictional characters
, a character in the visual novel H2O: Footprints in the Sand
, a character in the video game series La Corda d'Oro
, protagonist of the anime series Granbelm

See also
Kohinata, Tokyo, a neighbourhood in the Bunkyō ward of Tokyo, Japan
Hinata

Japanese-language surnames